Recorded on January 3, 1987, Live from Austin, TX is Johnny Cash's performance from the Austin, Texas television show, Austin City Limits. It was released on New West Records in 2005. Cash performs many old hits, and performs new ones from his latest releases on Mercury Records, where he just recently moved to. The CD and DVD do not contain the whole show — the songs "The Big Light", "A Wonderful Time Up There", and "The Fourth Man in the Fire" were left out.

Track list

Personnel
Johnny Cash - vocals, acoustic guitar
June Carter Cash - vocals
Anita Carter - vocals
Earl Poole Ball - piano
W.S. Holland - drums
Jim Soldi - electric guitar
Joe Allen - bass
Bob Wootton - electric guitar
Jack Hale Jr. - trumpet, harmonica
Bob Lewin - trumpet, keyboards

Additional personnel
Executive Producer: Cameron Strang
Producers: Cameron Strang, Jay Woods & Gary Briggs
Recorded By: David Hough, Sharon Cullen
Mixed By: Chet Himes @ Asm Studios
Audio Mastering: Jerry Tubb @ Terra Nova Digital Audio
Design: Katherine Delaney
Photography: Scott Newton
Project Coordinators: Mary Jurey & Clare Surgeson
Liner Notes: Terry Lickona

1987 live albums
Johnny Cash live albums
Austin City Limits